Marty Ehrlich (born May 31, 1955) is a multi-instrumentalist (saxophones, clarinets, flutes) and is considered one of the leading figures in avant-garde jazz.

Biography
Though born in St. Paul, Minnesota, the portion of Ehrlich's youth spent in St. Louis, Missouri, was particularly important. As a high school student at University City High School in nearby University City, the teenager came into contact with the influential Black Artists' Group (BAG, 1968–72) which was modelled after the AACM in Chicago.

Later, during formal studies at the New England Conservatory, Ehrlich developed a particularly close relationship with pianist Jaki Byard. It was here that he was most deeply schooled in traditional jazz forms, as well as Western European classical music.  During these formative years, Ehrlich was exposed to the cultural, political and musical workings of radical African-American art, and was mentored by such legends as Julius Hemphill and Oliver Lake. Often associated with "Radical Jewish Culture" and cult icon John Zorn, Ehrlich has throughout the years nevertheless resisted classification under any single musical genre. He has, for instance, been a mainstay of trumpeter Randy Sandke's Inside Out ensemble, which offers a unique combination of avant-garde–associated figures and mainstreamers.

Since his 1978 move to New York, Ehrlich has been a performer and leader with numerous bands of legendary repute, as well as a soloist for a number of major orchestras. But perhaps his most important recent contribution to the story of Jazz and improvised musics, The Long View, was completed at a residency in Harvard. The composition (scored for an ensemble of both strings and horns) is inspired from abstract paintings by Oliver Jackson, and has been hailed as "one of a handful of integral long-form works in jazz, standing beside those of the likes of Hemphill, Mingus, and Ellington" (Boston Phoenix).

Ehrlich currently lives in New York City, commuting to teach at Hampshire College, and devoting much energy to his duo with pianist Myra Melford, and trio with Mark Dresser (contrabass) and Andrew Cyrille (drums).

Discography

As leader 
 The Welcome with Anthony Cox, Pheeroan akLaff (1984)
 Pliant Pliant with Stan Strickland, Anthony Cox, Bobby Previte (1988)
 Falling Man with Anthony Cox (Muse (1989)
 The Traveller's Tale with Stan Strickland, Lindsey Horner, Bobby Previte (1990)
 Side by Side with Frank Lacy, Wayne Horvitz, Anthony Cox, Andrew Cyrille (1991)
 Marty Ehrlich's Dark Woods Ensemble, Emergency Peace (New World, 1991) – with Abdul Wadud, Muhal Richard Abrams, Lindsey Horner
 Can You Hear a Motion? with Stan Strickland, Michael Formanek, Bobby Previte (1994)
 Marty Ehrlich's Dark Woods Ensemble, Just Before the Dawn (New World, 1995) – with Vincent Chancey, Erik Friedlander, Mark Helias, Don Alias
 New York Child with Stan Strickland, Michael Cain, Michael Formanek, Bill Stewart (Enja, 1996) – recorded in 1995
 Light at the Crossroads with Ben Goldberg (Songlines Recordings, 1997) – recorded in 1996
 Marty Ehrlich's Dark Woods Ensemble, Live Wood (Music & Arts, 1997) - with Erik Friedlander, Mark Helias. recorded in 1996.
 Marty Ehrlich's Dark Woods Ensemble, Sojourn (Tzadik, 1999) – with Erik Friedlander, Mark Helias, Marc Ribot
 The Waiting Game with Mike Nock (Naxos Jazz, 2000)
 Marty Ehrlich's Traveler's Tales, Malinke's Dance (OmniTone, 2000) – with Tony Malaby, Jerome Harris, Bobby Previte
 Song (Enja, 2001) – with Uri Caine, Michael Formanek, Billy Drummond, Ray Anderson
 The Long View (Enja, 2002)
 Line on Love (Palmetto, 2003) – with Craig Taborn, Michael Formanek, Billy Drummond
 News on the Rail (Palmetto, 2005) - recorded in 2004
 Marty Ehrlich Rites Quartet, Things Have Got to Change (Clean Feed, 2009)
 Fables (Tzadik, 2010)
 Marty Ehrlich Rites Quartet, Frog Leg Logic (Clean Feed, 2011)
 Marty Ehrlich Large Ensemble, A Trumpet in the Morning (New World, 2013) - recorded in 2012
 Trio Exaltation (Clean Feed, 2018)

As sideman 
With Ray Anderson
Big Band Record (Gramavision, 1994) with the George Gruntz Concert Jazz Band

With Anthony Braxton
Knitting Factory (Piano/Quartet) 1994, Vol. 1 (Leo, 1994)
 Creative Orchestra (Köln) 1978 (hatART, 1995) – recorded 1978
Piano Quartet, Yoshi's 1994 (Music & Arts, 1996) – recorded 1994
Knitting Factory (Piano/Quartet) 1994, Vol. 2 (Leo, 2000) – recorded 1994

With John Carter
 Castles of Ghana (Gramavision, 1986)
 Dance of the Love Ghosts (Gramavision, 1987)
 Fields (Gramavision, 1988)
 Shadows on a Wall (Gramavision, 1989)

With Anthony Coleman
 Lapidation (New World, 2007)

With Don Grolnick
 Nighttown (Blue Note, 1992)

With the Julius Hemphill Sextet
 Fat Man and the Hard Blues (Black Saint, 1991)
 Five Chord Stud (Black Saint, 1994)
 At Dr. King's Table (New World, 1997)
 The Hard Blues: Live in Lisbon (Cleanfeed, 2004)

With Michael Gregory Jackson
 Gifts (Arista Novus, 1979)

With Leroy Jenkins
 Mixed Quintet (Black Saint, 1979)
 Themes & Improvisations on the Blues (CRI, 1994)

With John Lindberg
 Dimension 5 (Black Saint, 1981)

With Myra Melford
Even the Sounds Shine (Hat ART, 1995)

With Roscoe Mitchell
Sketches from Bamboo (Moers Music, 1979)

With Bobby Previte
 Weather Clear, Track Fast (Enja, 1991)
 Hue and Cry (Enja, 1993)

Awards and nominations

ARIA Music Awards
The ARIA Music Awards is an annual awards ceremony that recognises excellence, innovation, and achievement across all genres of Australian music. They commenced in 1987. 

! 
|-
| 2000
| The Waiting Game (with Mike Nock)
| Best Jazz Album
| 
| 
|-

References

External links
Marty Ehrlich
Discography

American jazz saxophonists
American male saxophonists
American jazz clarinetists
American jazz flautists
Avant-garde jazz musicians
Harvard University people
Musicians from St. Louis
Music of St. Louis
Living people
1955 births
Muse Records artists
Palmetto Records artists
Tzadik Records artists
Enja Records artists
21st-century American saxophonists
Jazz musicians from Missouri
21st-century clarinetists
21st-century American male musicians
American male jazz musicians
Human Arts Ensemble members
21st-century flautists